Enrico Domenic Tolentino del Rosario (born 21 March 1997) is a Northern Mariana Islander professional footballer who plays for the Northern Mariana Islands national team.

Career statistics

International

References

1997 births
Living people
People from Saipan
Northern Mariana Islands footballers
Association football midfielders
Northern Mariana Islands international footballers
Alderson Broaddus Battlers men's soccer players
Northern Kentucky Norse men's soccer players
Expatriate footballers in the Philippines